Romantic Call Centre (Korean: 사랑의 콜센타), or the full name We Will Sing Your Requested Songs — Romantic Call Centre (Korean: 신청곡을 불러드립니다 — 사랑의 콜센타) is a South Korean reality television show. This is the follow-up show of Mr Trot (including its epilogue version The Taste of Mr Trot), casting the top 7 of the now-defunct program.

The program was planned as a purpose of fan meeting, which was originally for Mr Trot but never occurred due to the coronavirus pandemic. Though it was initially organised for 3 episodes, it was remade as a regular on account of high popularity.

Cast

Hosts 
 Kim Sung-joo (Seasons 1–2)
 Boom (Seasons 1–2)

Main cast

Current
 Lim Young-woong (Seasons 1–2)
 Young Tak (Seasons 1–2)
 Lee Chan-won (Seasons 1–2)
  (Seasons 1–2)
 Jang Min-ho (Seasons 1–2)
  (Seasons 1–2)

Former
 Kim Ho-joong (Season 1, episodes 1–16)

Guests

Episodes

Season 1

Episode 1

Episode 2

Episode 3

Episode 4

Episode 5

Ratings 
In the tables below,  represent the lowest ratings and  represent the highest ratings.

Season 1

Season 2

Notes

References

External links 
 Official website

South Korean music television shows
Trot television series
2020 South Korean television series debuts
2021 South Korean television series endings